Franklin James Schaffner (May 30, 1920July 2, 1989) was an American film, television, and stage director. He won an Academy Award for Best Director for Patton (1970), and is known for the films Planet of the Apes (1968), Nicholas and Alexandra (1971), Papillon (1973), and The Boys from Brazil (1978). He served as president of the Directors Guild of America between 1987 and 1989.

Early life

Schaffner was born in Tokyo, Japan, the son of American missionaries Sarah Horting (née Swords) and Paul Franklin Schaffner, and was raised in Japan.

The Schaffners returned to the United States and settled in Lancaster, Pennsylvania when Franklin Schaffner was 5 years old. Franklin Schaffner attended J.P. McCaskey High School, where he appeared as Mr. Darcy in the school's production of Pride and Prejudice. In 1938, he graduated as valedictorian of McCaskey High School's first graduating class.

Schaffner graduated from Franklin & Marshall College (F&M) in Lancaster. As a student, Schaffner was active in the drama program at F&M's Green Room Theatre, where he appeared in eleven plays and served as president of the Green Room Club. He then studied law at Columbia University in New York City, but his education was interrupted by service with the United States Navy in World War II during which he served with amphibious forces in Europe and North Africa. In the latter stages of the war, he was sent to the Pacific Far East to serve with the United States Office for Strategic Services.

Television career
Schaffner returned to the United States after the war. He worked for a world peace organization, then as an assistant director for the documentary film series The March of Time. He became a director in the news and public affairs department of CBS television, where his jobs including covering sports, beauty pageants and public-service programs.

In 1950 he directed "The Traitor", the first episode of Ford Theatre. He also did adaptations of Alice in Wonderland and Treasure Island.

He directed "Thunder on Sycamore Street" by Reginald Rose for Studio One. He and Rose reunited on  Twelve Angry Men which won Schaffner an Emmy for Best Director.

The following year Schaffner earned another Emmy for his work on the 1955 TV adaptation of the Broadway play The Caine Mutiny Court-Martial, shown on the anthology series Ford Star Jubilee.

Schaffner became one of three regular directors on the Kaiser Aluminium Hour; the others were George Roy Hill and Fielder Cook. He was also a regular director on Playhouse 90.

He was the original director on the series, The Defenders, created by Rose. Schaffner's work earned him another Emmy.

In 1960, he directed Allen Drury's stage play Advise and Consent. This earned him the Best Director recognition in the Variety Critics Poll.

In the realm of network television, Schaffner also received widespread critical acclaim in 1962 for his groundbreaking collaboration with the First Lady of the United States Jacqueline Kennedy and CBS television's Musical Director Alfredo Antonini in the production of A Tour of the White House with Mrs. John F. Kennedy, a television special broadcast to over 80 million viewers worldwide.

Schaffner's contributions in this production earned him a nomination in 1963 by the Directors Guild of America, for its award in the category of Outstanding Directorial Achievement in Television.

Feature films

Early films
In January 1960 Schaffner signed a multi picture deal with Columbia Pictures.

In May 1961 he signed to make A Summer Place at 20th Century Fox with Fabian and Dolores Hart. The film was not made. Schaffner directed The Good Years (1962) for TV with Henry Fonda and Lucille Ball. Other TV work included The Great American Robbery.

Instead Schaffner's first motion picture was The Stripper (1963), made at Fox from a play by William Inge, starring Richard Beymer and Joanne Woodward. The film was well-received critically, but not a commercial success.

He continued to work for TV including The Legend of Lylah Clare.

Schaffner later made The Best Man (1964) based on a play by Gore Vidal and The War Lord (1965), based on a play by Leslie Stevens, with Charlton Heston. In a 1966 interview he said "as you mature you learn that the story is the most important thing." He announced various films for Columbia - The Day Lincoln Was Shot, The Whistle Blows for Victory and The Green Beret - but they were not made.

He went to Britain to make The Double Man (1967) with Yul Brynner, a film Schaffner admitted he did for the money.

Peak
Schaffner had a huge critical and commercial hit in Planet of the Apes (1968) starring Heston at 20th Century Fox.

In December 1968 Schaffner signed a non-exclusive three-picture deal with Columbia.

His next film was for 20th Century Fox, however: Patton (1970), a biopic of General Patton starring George C. Scott. It was a major success for which Schaffner won the Academy Award for Best Director and the Directors Guild of America Award for Best Director.

He made Nicholas and Alexandra (1971) for producer Sam Spiegel. It was an expensive box-office failure. Schaffner followed it with Papillon (1973) a $14 million epic with Steve McQueen and Dustin Hoffman that was a considerable financial success. In 1971 he said his films "are  almost always about people who are out of their time and place."

Schaffner intended to follow Papillon with Dynasty of Western Outlaws, about outlaws over the years in Missouri from a script by John Gay, and an adaptation of The French Lieutenant's Woman. He ended up making neither: Dynasty was never made, and French Lieutenant was made a decade later by another director.

Schaffner reunited with George C. Scott in Islands in the Stream (1977), based on the novel by Ernest Hemingway. He then did The Boys from Brazil (1978) based on a novel by Ira Levin with Gregory Peck.

Later work
His later films included Sphinx (1981), a $10 million thriller about Egypt based on a novel by Robin Cook and produced by Stanley O'Toole, who had made Boys from Brazil with Schaffner. It was a commercial and critical failure, as was Yes, Giorgio (1982), a musical comedy starring Luciano Pavarotti.

Schaffner's last films were the critically well-received Lionheart (1987) and Welcome Home (1989).

Schaffner was president of the Directors Guild of America from 1987 until his death in 1989.

Frequent collaborators
Jerry Goldsmith composed the music for seven of his films: The Stripper, Planet of the Apes, Patton, Papillon, Islands in the Stream, The Boys from Brazil and Lionheart. Four of them were nominated for the Academy Award for Best Original Score.

Schaffner twice worked with actors Charlton Heston and Maurice Evans (The War Lord; Planet of the Apes), George C. Scott (Patton; Islands in the Stream) and Laurence Olivier (Nicholas and Alexandra; The Boys from Brazil).

Personal life

Schaffner married Helen Jean Gilchrist in 1948. The couple had two children, Jennie and Kate. She died in 2007.

Schaffner died on July 2, 1989, at the age of 69. He was released 10 days before his death from a hospital where he was being treated for lung cancer.

Critical perception
Screenwriter William Goldman identified Schaffner in 1981 as being one of the three best directors (then living) at handling "scope" (a gift for screen epics) in films. The other two were David Lean and Richard Attenborough.

Legacy
In 1991, Schaffner's widow, Jean Schaffner, established the Franklin J. Schaffner Alumni Medal (colloquially known as the Franklin J. Schaffner Award), which is awarded by the American Film Institute at its annual ceremony to an alumnus of either the AFI Conservatory or the AFI Conservatory Directing Workshop for Women who best embodies the qualities of the late director: talent, taste, dedication and commitment to quality filmmaking. Notable recipients include David Lynch, Amy Heckerling, Terence Malick, Darren Aronofsky, Patty Jenkins and Paul Schrader, among others.

The Directors Guild of America also began presenting a Franklin J. Schaffner Achievement Award to associate directors or stage managers in 1991.

The moving image collection of Franklin J. Schaffner is held at the Academy Film Archive.

In May 2020, the mayor of Lancaster, Pennsylvania, proclaimed Franklin Schaffner Week (May 23–30, 2020) to mark the centennial of his birth.

Filmography

Film

Television

Awards and nominations

References

External links

 
 
 

1920 births
1989 deaths
American film directors
Best Directing Academy Award winners
Burials at Westwood Village Memorial Park Cemetery
Columbia Law School alumni
Primetime Emmy Award winners
Franklin & Marshall College alumni
Presidents of the Directors Guild of America
United States Navy officers
United States Navy personnel of World War II
People of the Office of Strategic Services
Directors Guild of America Award winners
American expatriates in Japan
People from Lancaster, Pennsylvania
People from Tokyo
English-language film directors
Science fiction film directors
Military personnel from Pennsylvania